David Prinosil was the defending champion but did not compete that year.

Nicolás Pereira won in the final 4–6, 6–4, 6–4 against Grant Stafford.

Seeds
A champion seed is indicated in bold text while text in italics indicates the round in which that seed was eliminated.

  Byron Black (quarterfinals)
  Shuzo Matsuoka (first round)
  Michael Joyce (second round)
  Sandon Stolle (second round)
  Patrick Rafter (second round)
  Martin Damm (second round)
  Stéphane Simian (first round)
  Mark Knowles (second round)

Draw

References
 1996 Miller Lite Hall of Fame Championships Draw

Singles